Uroplatus pietschmanni, known commonly as the cork-bark leaf-tail gecko, the cork bark leaftail gecko, and the spiny leaf-tailed gecko, is a species of lizard in the family Gekkonidae. The species is endemic to Madagascar.

Etymology
The specific name, pietschmanni, is in honor of German gecko breeder Jürgen Pietschmann (1949–2005).

Geographic range
U. pietschmanni is found in Toamasina Province, Madagascar.

Habitat

Description
U. pietschmanni is a medium-sized species for its genus.

Reproduction
U. pietschmanni is oviparous.

References

Further reading
Böhle, Andreas; Schönecker, Patrick (2003). "Eine neue Art der Gattung Uroplatus Duméril, 1805 aus Ost-Madagaskar (Reptilia: Squamata: Gekkonidae): A new species of the genus Uroplatus from eastern Madasascar". Salamandra, Rheinbach 39 (3/4): 129–138. (Uroplatus pietschmanni, new species). (in German and English).
Greenbaum E, Bauer AM, Jackman TR, Vences M, Glaw F (2007). "A phylogeny of the enigmatic Madagascan geckos of the genus Uroplatus (Squamata: Gekkonidae)". Zootaxa 1493: 41–51.
Ratsoavina FN, Raminosoa NR, Lewis EE Jr, Raselimanana AP, Glaw F, Vences M (2013). "An overview of Madagascar's leaf tailed geckos (genus Uroplatus): species boundaries, candidate species and review of geographical distribution based on molecular data". Salamandra 49 (3): 115–148.

Uroplatus
Reptiles described in 2003